Reykjavík's City Hall is situated by the Tjörnin (City Pond) in Reykjavík. It houses the offices of the mayor of Reykjavík and a large 3D map of Iceland. The city hall is sometimes used for art exhibitions, functions or live music performances.

The building was constructed in 1992 following an international competition won by architects Studio Granda.

External links 
 City Hall visitor information
 (Pictures of the Reykjavík's City Hall, lightened up in pink. Gallery from www.islandsmyndir.is c)

Buildings and structures in Reykjavík
Tourist attractions in Reykjavík
Seats of local government in Europe